Yeong-ok, also spelled Young-ok or Yong-ok, is a Korean feminine given name. Its meaning differs based on the hanja used to write each syllable of the name. There are 34 hanja with the reading "yeong" and five hanja with the reading "ok" on the South Korean government's official list of hanja which may be registered for use in given names.

People with this name include:

Sportspeople
Kim Young-ok (speed skater) (born 1962), South Korean female speed skater
Kim Yong-ok (weightlifter) (born 1976), North Korean female weightlifter
Kim Yeong-ok (born 1974), South Korean female basketball player
Jong Yong-ok (born 1981), North Korean female long distance runner
Hong Yong-ok (born 1986), North Korean female weightlifter
Pak Yong-ok, North Korean female table tennis player

Other
Young-Oak Kim (1919–2005), Korean-born American male soldier
Kim Young-ok (actress) (born 1937), South Korean actress
Kim Soo-mi (born Kim Young-ok, 1949), South Korean actress known for her role in Country Diaries
Shin Youngok (born 1961), South Korean female lyric coloratura soprano
Young Kim (born Choe Young-oak, 1962), South Korean-born American female politician

See also
List of Korean given names

References

Korean feminine given names